This is a list of the cotton and other textile mills in the City of Salford,  Greater Manchester, England.

The mills

References

Bibliography

External links

Salford
Salford
 
Companies based in Salford